Niels Macholm (26 August 1915 – 5 November 1997) was a self-taught Danish artist. He had his debut at Kunstnernes Efterårsudstilling in 1944 and received the Eckersberg Medal in 1976.

References

1915 births
1997 deaths
20th-century Danish painters
Recipients of the Eckersberg Medal